Matías Andrés Escudero (born 15 December 1988) is an Argentine footballer who currently plays as a centre-back for San Martín SJ of the Primera Nacional in Argentina.

Honours 
Nueva Chicago
 Argentine Primera B Metropolitana Championship: 2013–14

References 

1988 births
Living people
Argentine footballers
Argentine expatriate footballers
Nueva Chicago footballers
Club Deportivo Palestino footballers
San Martín de San Juan footballers
Club Atlético Patronato footballers
Chilean Primera División players
Argentine Primera División players
Primera Nacional players
Argentine expatriate sportspeople in Chile
Expatriate footballers in Chile
Association football defenders
People from San Luis, Argentina